Taghairm, sometimes interpreted as "spiritual echo," or calling up the dead, was an ancient Scottish mode of divination. The definition of what was required varied, but often involved torture or cruelty to humans or animals and sometimes included animal sacrifice.

The Scottish writer Màrtainn MacGille Mhàrtainn describes three different ways of consulting spirits common in the Scottish Hebrides in the 17th century.  All involved acts which were supposed to summon spirits or demons in the form of animals which would answer questions concerning the future.

In one version of the taghairm said to be one of the most effective means of raising the devil, and getting unlawful wishes gratified, the ritual included roasting cats alive, one after the other, for several days without tasting food. This version of the taghairm supposedly summoned a legion of devils in the guise of black cats, with their master at their head, all screeching in a terrifying way. The ritual is described in Gustav Meyrink’s book on John Dee, The Angel of the West Window.

An 1825 text described a different technique:

A similar description was given for taghairm in Trotternish in a 1772 account of the region, and a number of closely matching accounts with hides and waterfalls can also be found, with some additionally including the diviner being beaten for a while with a pole or a staff after being covered by the animal skin.

Scottish historical novelist Sir Walter Scott scornfully described a third method in a footnote to his influential poem Lady of the Lake. He further adds that it could involve another situation "where the scenery around him suggested nothing but objects of horror." However, Scott could not speak Scottish Gaelic and his concepts of Gaelic culture were sometimes distorted.

Other variations practiced have been recorded, and the same name has also been applied to other ritual customs. One variation of the ritual was said to summon a demonic cat called Big Ears, who would grant the summoners answers to their questions and fulfill their wishes. The last ceremony of this kind is said to have been performed on the island of Mull in the beginning of the seventeenth century, and was recorded in the London Literary Gazette of March 1824.

Other regions
The animal skin and waterfall method of divination was also known in Wales.

References

Cruelty to animals
Divination
Scottish folklore